Stanislav Kozubek (born June 9, 1980 in Prague) is a former Czech cyclist.

Palmares

1999
3rd Junior World Team Pursuit Championships
2001
1st Team pursuit European Track Championships
2005
3rd National Road Race Championships
3rd Grand Prix Cycliste de Gemenc
 National Scratch Champion
 National Team Pursuit Champion
2006
 National Road Race Champion
1st stage 4b Okolo Slovenska
2007
 National Time Trial Champion
1st Prague-Karlovy Vary-Prague
2008
3rd National Road Race Championships
2009
2nd National Time Trial Championships
3rd National Road Race Championships
2010
2nd Oberösterreich-Rundfahrt
2nd National Road Race Championships
3rd Raiffeisen Grand Prix
2011
1st Czech Cycling Tour

References

1980 births
Living people
Czech male cyclists
Sportspeople from Prague